Smolej is a Slovenian surname that may refer to
Franc Smolej (ice hockey) (born 1940), Slovenian ice hockey player
Franc Smolej (skier) (1908–?), Yugoslav Olympic cross-country skier
Roman Smolej (born 1946), Yugoslav ice hockey player
Uroš Smolej (born 1985), Slovenian football defender

See also
Smole